Prodoxus mapimiensis is a moth of the family Prodoxidae. It is found in Mexico in the Chihuahuan Desert, from Saltillo-Torre north to the Big Bend region of western Texas, United States.

The forewings are usually white. The hindwings are white with a light gray apex.

References

Moths described in 2005
Prodoxidae